Mazowa Nsumbu (born 24 September 1982) is a retired Congolese footballer.

Mazowa started his career in Congolese club Tula-Mpaka and later moved to play in AS Vita Club in Congo. He then tried his luck in Belgium, but was not signed by any club and moved to Israel to play for Hapoel Haifa with his friend from Vita Club, Jeff Tutuana. After two years in Hapoel Haifa he moved to Beitar Jerusalem FC with Jeff Tutuana and became one of the notable players of 2006. He played for Hapoel Tel Aviv F.C. after moving from Maccabi Natanya and after a season in Tel Aviv he moved to Bnei Sakhnin but in January 2009 he moved to Kocaelispor of the Turkey's Süper Lig and in July he moved to Istanbul B.B.

Honours
Congolese Cup (1):
2001
Linafoot (1):
2003
Liga Leumit (1):
2003–04

External links

1982 births
Living people
Democratic Republic of the Congo footballers
Democratic Republic of the Congo international footballers
AS Vita Club players
Maccabi Netanya F.C. players
Beitar Jerusalem F.C. players
Hapoel Tel Aviv F.C. players
Bnei Sakhnin F.C. players
Hapoel Haifa F.C. players
Kocaelispor footballers
İstanbul Başakşehir F.K. players
Samsunspor footballers
Süper Lig players
Liga Leumit players
Israeli Premier League players
Daring Club Motema Pembe players
Democratic Republic of the Congo expatriate footballers
Expatriate footballers in Israel
Expatriate footballers in Turkey
Expatriate footballers in Malaysia
Democratic Republic of the Congo expatriate sportspeople in Israel
Democratic Republic of the Congo expatriate sportspeople in Turkey
Democratic Republic of the Congo expatriate sportspeople in Malaysia
Association football midfielders